Grey District Council is the territorial authority for the Grey District of New Zealand.

The council is led by the mayor of Grey, who is currently . There are also eight ward councillors.

The council operates four departments: infrastructure, environmental services, corporate planning and community, and corporate services.

Composition

Councillors

 Mayor 
 Eastern Ward: Deputy Mayor Allan Gibson, Anton Becker
 Central Ward: Murray Hay, Tim Mora, Patrick McBride
 Northern Ward: Rosemary Green
 Southern Ward: Peter Haddock, Rex MacDonald

History

The council was formed in 1989, replacing Greymouth County Council (1868-1989) and Runanga County Council (1912-1989).

In 2020, the council had 78 staff, including 10 earning more than $100,000. According to the right-wing Taxpayers' Union think tank, residential rates averaged $1,739.

References

External links
 Grey District Council

Grey District
Politics of the West Coast, New Zealand
Territorial authorities of New Zealand